MIA Rossiya Segodnya is a media group owned and operated by the Russian government, created on the basis of RIA Novosti. The group owns and operates Sputnik, RIA Novosti, inoSMI and several other entities. The head of the organisation is Dmitry Kiselyov. Margarita Simonyan is the chief editor.

History 
Rossiya Segodnya incorporates the former RIA Novosti news service and the international radio service Voice of Russia (formerly Radio Moscow). According to the Decree of the President of Russia on 9 December 2013, the mandate of the new agency is to "provide information on Russian state policy and Russian life and society for audiences abroad." Vladimir Putin's chief of staff, Sergei Ivanov, said that Rossiya Segodnya was being created in order to increase the cost efficiency in Russian state media. However, RIA Novosti's own report about the move speculated it was an attempt to consolidate state control over the media sector and Western news outlets stated that this was also a move by Putin to propagate a more pleasant image of Russia abroad.

According to a report on the RT news channel, Rossiya Segodnya is "in no way related" to the RT news channel despite the similarity in name (RT was known as Russia Today prior to its rebranding in 2009). However, a report by the BBC states that it "seems likely [...] that [Rossiya Segodnya] will complement the work of the state-funded foreign-language TV station, RT." On 31 December 2013, Margarita Simonyan was appointed editor-in-chief of the news agency, as well as being RT's news channel editor-in-chief. She will serve in both positions concurrently.

On 10 November 2014, the agency launched the Sputnik multimedia platform with Radio Sputnik as its audio component, replacing the Voice of Russia. The radio service is available internationally on FM, digital DAB/DAB+ (Digital Radio Broadcasting), HD-Radio, as well as mobile phones and the Internet. Within Russia itself, Rossiya Segodnya continues to use the RIA Novosti brand as its Russian-language news agency using the website ria.ru. 

In 2015 Rossiya Segondya received 6.48 billion rubles from the state budget. Following his transfer from Ukraine to Russia on 7 September 2019 as part of the Ukraine-Russia prisoner exchanges, Kirill Vyshinsky became the executive director of Rossiya Segodnya on 9 September 2019.

Projects 

 Sputnik
 RIA Novosti
 inoSMI
 ukraina.ru
 Baltnews

Controversy

Allegations of homophobia
This organisatation is headed by Dmitry Kiselyov, a pro-Putin news presenter on the domestic Russia-1 television channel, who has gained significant controversy in the Western media with his remarks claiming foreign conspiracies against Russia and verbally abusing homosexuals.

Kiselyov, who has been described as the "spearhead" of such anti-LGBTQ propaganda on the network, has made various provocative comments regarding the Russian LGBTQ community. He has stated that a homosexual person's organs are unworthy of being transplanted to a heterosexual, and that gay men should be prohibited from donating blood or sperm. The Russian LGBTQ community has also been referred to by Kiselyov as an "aggressive minority" opposed to "parents fighting to give their children a healthy upbringing", stating falsified statistics that "40% of children brought up by homosexuals have venereal diseases".

Allegations of censorship 

On 1 December 2014, Ukrainian journalist Oleksandr Chalenko accused Rossiya Segodnya of censorship after an interview with the former Defense Minister of the self-proclaimed Donetsk People's Republic, Igor Strelkov. The Strelkov's press service and the agency's editorial staff reduced it, removing the confirmation of Igor Strelkov's own title of Colonel of the FSB and the negative assessment of the assault by Donetsk airport units.

Awards 
On 17 May 2017 MIA Rossiya Segodnya design center was awarded The Communicator Awards: gold - in the category "Marketing and Promotion" and two silver.

Sanctions 
In February 2023 Canada sanctioned Rossiya Segodnya for being involved in Russian propaganda and spreading misinformation relating to the 2022 war in Ukraine.

See also
Media of Russia

References

External links

 

News agencies based in Russia
Russian news websites
Mass media companies of Russia
2013 establishments in Russia
Companies established in 2013
Mass media in Moscow
Federal State Unitary Enterprises of Russia
Companies based in Moscow
State media
Government-owned companies of Russia
Russian propaganda organizations
Radio stations in Russia
Radio networks
Propaganda radio broadcasts
Russian-language radio stations
International broadcasters
English-language radio stations
Arabic-language radio stations
Armenian-language radio stations
Azerbaijani-language radio stations
Chinese-language radio stations
German-language radio stations
Greek-language radio stations
French-language radio stations
Korean-language radio stations
Portuguese-language radio stations
Persian-language radio stations
Romanian-language radio stations
Spanish-language radio stations
Turkish-language radio stations
Conspiracist media